Alhagi Marie Touray Sisay (born 31 December 1999), known as Touray, is a Spanish professional footballer who plays as a striker for Accrington Stanley.

Touray came through the youth system at Llagostera before playing for CF Santvicentí. In 2019 he moved to the United Kingdom where he played for English Non-League side Ramsgate before a spell in the Cymru Premier for Aberystwyth Town. He turned professional with Grimsby Town of EFL League Two, and spent time back in Non-League with Cleethorpes Town.

Career

Early career 
Touray played for the youth team at Llagostera in the 2017–18 season, before moving on to CF Santvicentí in the Tercera Catalana, where he scored 35 goals in 31 games in the 2018–19 season. He also had trials with Scottish club Heart of Midlothian and English clubs Hull City and Stoke City.

After a brief spell at English non-league club Ramsgate, Touray moved to Welsh club Aberystwyth Town in January 2020, for whom he scored 4 goals in 5 league games, including one hat-trick.

Grimsby Town 
In August 2020 moved to English club Grimsby Town. On 9 October 2020, Touray joined Cleethorpes Town on a one-month loan, along with Grimsby team mate Joey Hope. He scored on his debut in a 3–2 defeat against Leek Town. Touray returned to Grimsby and made his professional debut on 17 November 2020, appearing as a substitute in the EFL Trophy defeat away at Hull City. He made his league debut in a 3–1 defeat against Southend United on 15 December 2020, as a 79th minute replacement for Ira Jackson Jr.

On 1 February 2021, transfer deadline day, Grimsby attempted to loan Touray out once more, this time back to Wales with Connah's Quay Nomads. The transfer fell through due to a late application for international clearance with Mariners boss Paul Hurst commenting "I think it's probably become apparent already that he's going to find it difficult to break into this first team squad, and it would have been good for the lad to have gone and got some games."

On 12 May 2021 it was announced that Touray would leave Grimsby at the end of the season, following the expiry of his contract.

Haverfordwest County 
On 18 August 2021, following his release from Grimsby, Touray returned to Wales to join Haverfordwest County. On 18 September 2021, he scored twice to give the club their first win of the season against Flint Town. After a spell out with injury Touray scored the winning goal on 30 October 2021 in a match against Newtown.

Accrington Stanley 
On 25 July 2022, Touray signed for Accrington Stanley.

Career statistics

References

External links

1999 births
Living people
Spanish footballers
UE Costa Brava players
Ramsgate F.C. players
Aberystwyth Town F.C. players
Grimsby Town F.C. players
Cleethorpes Town F.C. players
Haverfordwest County A.F.C. players
Accrington Stanley F.C. players
Isthmian League players
Cymru Premier players
English Football League players
Northern Premier League players
Association football forwards
Spanish expatriate footballers
Spanish expatriate sportspeople in England
Expatriate footballers in England
Spanish expatriate sportspeople in Wales
Expatriate footballers in Wales
Spanish sportspeople of African descent
Spanish people of Gambian descent